Stephanie Grant (born 21 March 1987 in Hobart, Tasmania) is an Australian judoka, who played for the half-heavyweight category. She is a member of the University of Tasmania Judo Club, under her personal coach Milos Kovacik, and has twice been the Australian judo champion,.

Grant represented Australia at the 2008 Summer Olympics in Beijing, where she competed for the women's half-heavyweight class (78 kg). She received a bye for the second preliminary round match, before losing to Marylise Levesque of Canada, who successfully scored an ippon (full point) and an osotogari (big outer reap), at one minute and ten seconds.

References
stephanie grant highland il usa

External links

Australian Olympic Team profile

NBC Olympics profile

Australian female judoka
Living people
Olympic judoka of Australia
Judoka at the 2008 Summer Olympics
Sportspeople from Hobart
1987 births
20th-century Australian women
21st-century Australian women